21 Under 21 is an annually ranking by American music magazine Billboard beginning in 2010. It honours young musicians under the age of 21 in the music for impact over the previous and their potential to "rule pop culture zeitgeist over the next 12 months".

Taylor Swift topped the first ranking in 2010 at age 20. Justin Bieber (2011), Lorde (2014) and Billie Eilish (2019) are the youngest acts to be #1 (all aged 17). Willow Smith is the youngest act to appear on any ranking, (aged 9 in 2010). Smith also has the longest period of inclusion, appearing on five rankings across 11 years (2010, 2011, 2017, 2019 and 2021). Bieber; Camila Cabello; Lorde; Shawn Mendes; Smith and Grace VanderWaal are tied for the most appearances, with five each. Bieber and Mendes are the only acts to top the ranking more than once (twice each).

Poll results by year 

 2010
 2011
 2012
 2013
 2014
 2015
 2016
 2017
 2018
 2019
 2020
 2021
 2022

Musicians with multiple wins

2 wins
 Justin Bieber (consecutive)
 Shawn Mendes (consecutive)

1 wins
 24kGoldn
 The Kid Laroi 
 5 Seconds of Summer 
 Billie Eilish
 Taylor Swift 
 Lorde
 One Direction

People with multiple nominations

5 placements

 Justin Bieber (2010-2014)
 Billie Eilish (2018-2022)
 Lorde (2013-2017)
 Shawn Mendes (2014-2018)
 WILLOW (2010-2011, 2017, 2019, 2021)
 Grace VanderWaal (2016-2019, 2021)

4 placements

 Chloe x Halle (2016-2017, 2019–2020)
 Fifth Harmony (2013-2016)
 Mindless Behavior (2011-2013, 2017)
 Sabrina Carpenter (2016-2019)

3 placements

 CNCO (2016-2018)
 NCT Dream (2018-2020)
 One Direction (2011-2013)
 PRETTYMUCH (2017-2019)

2 placements

 Jxdn (2020-2021)
 The Kid Laroi (2020-2021)
 Manuel Turizo (2019-2020)
 Moore Kismet (2020-2021)
 NLE Choppa (2020-2021)
 Snail Mail (2018-2019)
|}

Notes

References

21st century in music
2010 introductions
Billboard awards